Csík may refer to:

Csík County, part of the Kingdom of Hungary from 1876 to 1918

and to several places in Harghita County, Romania, that have the prefix as part of their Hungarian-language name:

Bancu (Csíkbánkfalva), a village in Ciucsângeorgiu Commune
Bârzava (Csíkborzsova), a village in Frumoasa Commune
Ciceu (Csíkcsicsó), a commune
Şoimeni (Csíkcsomortán), a village in Păuleni-Ciuc Commune
Ciucani (Csíkcsekefalva), a village in Sânmartin Commune
Dănești (Csíkdánfalva), a commune
Delniţa (Csíkdelne), a village in Păuleni-Ciuc Commune
Ineu (Csíkjenőfalva), a village in Cârța Commune
Cârța (Csíkkarcfalva), a commune
Cozmeni (Csíkkozmás), a commune
Mădăraș (Csíkmadaras), a commune
Siculeni (Csíkmadéfalva until 1899), a commune
Armăşeni (Csíkménaság), a village in Ciucsângeorgiu Commune
Leliceni (Csíkszentlélek), a commune
Păuleni-Ciuc (Csíkpálfalva), a commune
Racu (Csíkrákos), a commune
Șumuleu Ciuc (Csíksomlyó), a neighborhood in Miercurea Ciuc city
Tomești (Csíkszenttamás), a commune
Ciucsângeorgiu (Csíkszentgyörgy), a commune
Sântimbru (Csíkszentimre), a commune
Sâncrăieni (Csíkszentkirály), a commune
Leliceni (Csíkszentlélek), a commune
Nicoleşti (Csíkszentmiklós), a village in Frumoasa Commune
Mihăileni (Csíkszentmihály), a commune
Sânmartin (Csíkszentmárton), a commune
Sânsimion (Csíkszentsimon), a commune
Tomești (Csíkszenttamás), a commune
Frumoasa (Csíkszépvíz), a commune
Miercurea Ciuc (Csíkszereda), a city and the county seat
Vrabia (Csíkverebes), a village in Tușnad Commune
Jigodin (Csíkzsögöd), part of Jigodin-Băi village in Miercurea Ciuc city

(In the Kingdom of Hungary, these were all part of Csíkszék, a Székely "seat" or settlement merged into Csík County in 1876.)

and to:

Vărgata (Csíkfalva), a commune in Mureș County, Romania